Hanging man may refer to:
 Hanging man (candlestick pattern), a pattern in financial analysis
 The Hanging Man (tarot card), a tarot card
Hanging Man, a play by Andrew Upton

See also 
 Death by hanging
 The Hanged Man (disambiguation)
 Hangman (disambiguation)
 Hanging Maw